José Henrique Duarte Mendes (born 7 August 1947) is a Portuguese former captain and singer. He participated in Festival da Canção in 1970, 1971, 1972, and 1973 but he did not win until 1975 when he performed "Madrugada" (lyrics and song from José Luís Tinoco), about Colonial War and 1974's Carnation Revolution.

He represented Portugal in Eurovision Song Contest 1975 with that song. He finished in 16th place with 16 points (a surprising 12 points from Turkey).

Discography 

Então Dizia-te (Single, 1970)
Adolescente/Dar e Cantar (Single, Philips, 1971)
Cidade Alheia/Town Without Sun (Single, Orfeu, 1972)
Gente (EP, Orfeu, 1973) Gente / O Retrato / Maria Vida Fria
Madrugada (Single, Orfeu, 1975)
Madrugada (LP, Orfeu, 1975?)

External links 
 Lyrics of the song Madrugada, in Portuguese and its translation in English

20th-century Portuguese male singers
Eurovision Song Contest entrants for Portugal
Eurovision Song Contest entrants of 1975
Portuguese soldiers
Living people
1947 births